Filoteo Samaniego Salazar (July 11, 1928 - February 21, 2013) was an Ecuadorian novelist, poet, historian,  translator, and diplomat. He became a member of the Ecuadorian Academy of Language in 1984, and was its secretary from 1996–2006. He was awarded Ecuador's most prestigious prize, the Premio Eugenio Espejo, in 2001.
Samaniego's diplomatic career began in 1949 as the chief of staff of the Ministry of Foreign Affairs of Ecuador. He served as Ecuador's Ambassador to Austria, Germany, Romania and Egypt; and was a permanent representative of Ecuador to the United Nations Industrial Development Organization (ONUDI); and held many other academic, national, and international posts in his lifetime.
He translated books from French to Spanish, including the Spanish translation of Chronique (1960) (trans. Crónica, 1961) by the French Nobel laureate Saint-John Perse.

Works

Poetry
 Agraz (Quito, 1956)
 Relente (Quito, 1958)
 Umiña (Quito, 1960)
 Signos II (Quito, 1966)
 El cuerpo desnudo de la tierra (Quito, 1973)
 Los niños sordos (Quito, 1978)
 Oficios del río (Quito, 1984)
 Los testimonios (Quito, 1992)
 La uña de Dios (Quito, 1996)

Novels
 Sobre sismos y otros miedos (Madrid, 1991)

Non-fiction
 Columnario quiteño (1972)
 Ecuador: un mundo verde junto al sol (dos volúmenes, 1979-1980) (English translation: Ecuador: A Fertile Land Blessed by the Sun, 1985, Editions Delroisse)
 Habla y arte americanos (1984)
 Consta en las antologías: Lírica ecuatoriana contemporánea (Bogotá, 1979)
 Poesía viva del Ecuador (Quito, 1990)
 La palabra perdurable (Quito, 1991).

References

1928 births
2013 deaths
Ecuadorian politicians
People from Quito
Ecuadorian translators
Ambassadors of Ecuador to Austria
Ambassadors of Ecuador to Germany
Ambassadors of Ecuador to Romania
Ambassadors of Ecuador to Egypt
20th-century translators